The 2021 Empress's Cup was the 43rd season of the Japanese women's football main cup competition.

Calendar and schedule 
Below are the dates for each round as given by the official schedule:

First round

Second round

Third round

Round of 16

Quarter-finals

Semi-finals

Final

References

Empress's Cup
2021 in Japanese women's football